David Zajas (born 1 May 1983, in Świerklaniec) is a German football coach and retired footballer of Polish origin. He is currently working as a manager for Wuppertaler SV U19.

Career
He was with Bochum from 1998 to 2009, but mostly played for the second team VfL Bochum II in the lower leagues. His only, as of 2013, top level Bundesliga appearance came on 17 May 2003, when he came on as a substitute in the 79th minute in a game against Hamburger SV.

Statistics

References

External links
 
 

1983 births
Living people
People from Tarnowskie Góry County
German footballers
German people of Polish descent
VfL Bochum players
VfL Bochum II players
SSVg Velbert players
SG Wattenscheid 09 players
Bundesliga players
Association football midfielders
FC Wegberg-Beeck players